Camp Evans is a former U.S. Army and U.S. Marine Corps base northwest of Huế in central Vietnam.

History

1966-7
Camp Evans was established by the 3rd Battalion, 26th Marines in late 1966 as part of Operation Chinook. The camp was located to the west of Highway 1, approximately 24 km northwest of Huế in Thừa Thiên–Huế Province. The camp was named after Marine Lance Corporal Paul Evans who was killed during Operation Chinook.

Marine units based at Camp Evans during this period included:
4th Marine Regiment

1968

In January 1968 Camp Evans was taken over by the 1st Cavalry Division (Airmobile).

On the night of 19 May 1968 the ammunition dump at Camp Evans was hit by People's Army of Vietnam (PAVN) rockets and exploded causing a chain reaction and fire that lasted more than 12 hours and damaged or destroyed 124 aircraft rendering the 1st Brigade, 1st Cavalry Division combat ineffective for a week until replacement aircraft arrived.

On 3 October 1968 a USAF C-7 Caribou (#63-9753) that had just taken off from the Camp Evans airstrip collided with a 1st Cavalry Boeing CH-47 Chinook (#66-19041) resulting in the death of all 24 passengers and crew on both aircraft.

1969-72
Camp Evans was taken over by 1st Brigade, 101st Airborne Division.

Army units based at Camp Evans during this period included: 
158th Assault Helicopter Battalion
3rd Battalion, 187th Infantry Regiment
2nd Battalion, 94th Artillery Regiment (November 1969 – 1970)
18th Surgical Hospital (March–December 1969)
63rd Signal Battalion (March 1970-January 1972)
 C Battery, 4th Battalion, 77th Artillery (Aerial Rocket Artillery), 101st Airborne Division (Airmobile)
 101st Military Police, Third Platoon.

The 20th Tactical Air Support Squadron used Camp Evans as a forward operating base.

Current use
The base is abandoned and turned over to farmland.

References

External links 

 Camp Evans, Vietnam (1971), Texas Archive of the Moving Image

Buildings and structures in Thừa Thiên Huế province
Military installations of the United States Marine Corps in South Vietnam
Installations of the United States Army in South Vietnam
Military installations closed in the 1970s